True Romance is a 1993 American romantic crime film directed by Tony Scott and written by Quentin Tarantino. It features an ensemble cast led by Christian Slater and Patricia Arquette, with Dennis Hopper, Val Kilmer, Gary Oldman, Brad Pitt, and Christopher Walken in supporting roles. Slater and Arquette portray newlyweds on the run from the Mafia after stealing a shipment of drugs.

True Romance began life as an early script by Tarantino; he sold the screenplay in order to finance his debut feature film, Reservoir Dogs (1992). It is regarded by proponents as a cross-section of writer Tarantino and director Scott's respective trademarks, including a Southern California setting, pop cultural references, and stylized violence punctuated by slow motion.

Though initially a box-office failure, the film's positive reviews, with critics praising the dialogue, characters, and off-beat style, earned it a cult following. It has come to be considered one of Scott's best films and one of the best American films of the 1990s.

Plot
At a Detroit theater showing kung fu films, Alabama Whitman strikes up a conversation with Elvis Presley fanatic Clarence Worley. They later have sex at his downtown apartment. Alabama tearfully confesses that she is a call girl hired by his boss as a birthday present but has fallen in love with him. The two get married the next day at City Hall. An apparition of Elvis visits Clarence and convinces him to kill Alabama's abusive pimp, Drexl Spivey. Going to the brothel where Alabama worked, he shoots and kills Drexl, and takes a bag he assumes contains Alabama's belongings. Back at the apartment, he and Alabama discover it contains a large amount of cocaine that Drexl had stolen from two drug pushers.

The couple visits Clarence's estranged father Clifford, a retired cop, for help. He tells Clarence the police assume Drexl's murder is a gang killing committed in revenge for the murdered dealers. After the couple leave for Los Angeles, Clifford is interrogated by Vincenzo Coccotti, consigliere to mobster "Blue Lou Boyle", who had hired Drexl to steal and distribute the cocaine on his behalf. He reveals that the mob knows about Clarence's theft since they found his driver's license near Drexl's body. Clifford, realizing he will die anyway, mockingly defies Coccotti, who shoots him dead. One of his men then finds an LA address taped to Clifford's refrigerator. 

In LA, Clarence and Alabama meet Clarence's aspiring actor friend Dick Ritchie, who introduces him to actor and production assistant Elliot Blitzer. He reluctantly agrees to broker the sale of the drugs to his boss, legendary film producer Lee Donowitz. While Clarence is out buying lunch, Coccotti's enforcer Virgil finds Alabama in her motel room and beats her for information. Alabama fights back, using hairspray to set fire to Virgil's clothes and putting nail polish in his eyes, before grabbing his sawn-off shotgun, stabbing him with a corkscrew, and shooting him to death in a maniacal rage. Clarence tends to her wounds, and they discuss their future together.

Elliot is pulled over for speeding and gets charged when his mistress spills a bag of cocaine after he tries to hide it in her dress. To stay out of jail, he agrees to wear a wire and record the drug deal between Clarence and Donowitz for police detectives Dimes and Nicholson. Coccotti's men also learn about where the deal will take place from Dick's stoner roommate Floyd. Clarence, Alabama, Dick, and Elliot go to Donowitz's suite at the Ambassador Hotel with the drugs. In the elevator, a suspicious Clarence threatens Elliot at gunpoint, but is persuaded by Elliot's pleading for mercy.

Clarence fabricates a story for Donowitz that the drugs were given to him by a corrupt cop, and he agrees to the sale. Excusing himself to the bathroom, the vision of Elvis reassures him that things are going well. Donowitz and his bodyguards are ambushed by the cops and the mobsters. Elliot reveals himself to be an informant by asking the cops if he could leave, whereupon a shootout erupts. Dick throws the suitcase of the drugs in the air, where it gets shredded by gunfire, and flees. Donowitz, his bodyguards, Elliot, the cops, and the mobsters are all killed, and Clarence is wounded as he exits the bathroom. He and Alabama escape with Donowitz's money as more police arrive. They flee to Mexico where Alabama gives birth to a son, whom they name Elvis.

Cast

Production
The title and plot are a play on the titles of romance comic books such as True Life Secrets, True Stories of Romance, Romance Tales, Untamed Love and Strange Love.

The film was a breakthrough for Tarantino. Released after Reservoir Dogs, it was his first screenplay for a major motion picture, and Tarantino contends that it is his most autobiographical film to date. He had hoped to direct the film, but lost interest in directing and sold the script. According to Tarantino's audio commentary on the DVD release, he was happy with the way it turned out. Apart from changing the nonlinear narrative he wrote to a more conventional linear structure, it was largely faithful to his original screenplay. He initially opposed director Tony Scott's decision to change the ending (which Scott maintained was of his own volition, not the studio's, saying "I just fell in love with these two characters and didn’t want to see them die"). When seeing the completed film, he realized Scott's happy ending was more appropriate to the film as Scott directed it.  The film's first act, as well as some fragments of dialogue, were repurposed from Tarantino's 1987 amateur film My Best Friend's Birthday.

The film's score by Hans Zimmer is a theme based on Gassenhauer from Carl Orff's Schulwerk. This theme, combined with a voiceover spoken by Arquette, is an homage to Terrence Malick's 1973 crime film Badlands, in which Sissy Spacek speaks the voiceover, and that also shares similar dramatic motifs.

The movie was heavily censored by the UK BBFC. The majority of the confrontation between Alabama and Virgil was cut as well as much of Floyd's drug use. There was also an alternative ending where Detective Nicky Dimes was not shot by Alabama but by Toothpick Vic, one of the mafia hitmen, instead. This edit was the official 1993 VHS release but subsequently all DVD and Blu-ray releases are of the original uncensored American version.

Reception

Critical reception
On the review aggregator website Rotten Tomatoes the film holds an approval rating of 93% with an average rating of 7.6/10, based on 55 reviews. The site's critics consensus states: "Fueled by Quentin Tarantino's savvy screenplay and a gallery of oddball performances, Tony Scott's True Romance is a funny and violent action jaunt in the best sense." On Metacritic the film received a weighted average score of 59 out of 100 based on 19 critics, indicating "mixed or average reviews". Audiences polled by CinemaScore gave the film an average grade of "B−" on an A+ to F scale.

Phil Villarreal of the Arizona Daily Star called it "one of the most dynamic action films of the 1990s". Peter Travers of Rolling Stone gave it three stars, saying "it's Tarantino's gutter poetry that detonates True Romance. This movie is dynamite."

Roger Ebert gave the film a positive review remarking that "the energy and style of the movie are exhilarating", and that "the supporting cast is superb, a roll call of actors at home in these violent waters: Christopher Walken, Dennis Hopper, and Brad Pitt, for example". A negative review by The Washington Posts Richard Harrington claimed the film was "stylistically visceral" yet "aesthetically corrupt".

Janet Maslin of The New York Times wrote, "True Romance, a vibrant, grisly, gleefully amoral road movie directed by Tony Scott and dominated by the machismo of Quentin Tarantino (who wrote this screenplay before he directed Reservoir Dogs), is sure to offend a good-sized segment of the moviegoing population".

Box office performance
Although a critical success, True Romance was a box office failure. It was given a domestic release and earned $12.3 million on a $12.5 million budget. Despite this, the film developed a cult following over the years.

Legacy
Empire ranked True Romance the 83rd greatest film of all time in 2017, writing: "Tony Scott's handling of Quentin Tarantino's script came off like the cinematic equivalent of cocaine-flavoured bubble-gum: a bright, flavoursome confection that had an intoxicatingly violent kick. It also drew some tremendous big names to its supporting cast."

The Hopper/Walken scene, colloquially named "The Sicilian scene", was praised by Oliver Lyttelton of IndieWire, who called it "one of the most beautiful tête-à-têtes in contemporary cinema, wonderfully written and made utterly iconic by the two virtuoso actors". Tarantino himself has named it as one of his proudest moments. "I had heard that whole speech about the Sicilians a long time ago, from a black guy living in my house. One day I was talking with a friend who was Sicilian and I just started telling that speech. And I thought: 'Wow, that is a great scene, I gotta remember that'."

Oldman's villain also garnered acclaim. MSN Movies wrote: "With just a few minutes of screen time, Gary Oldman crafts one of cinema's most memorable villains: the brutal, dreadlocked pimp Drexl Spivey. Even in a movie jammed with memorable cameos from screen luminaries [...] Oldman's scar-faced, dead-eyed, lethal gangster stood out." Jason Serafino of Complex named Spivey as one of the top five coolest drug dealers in movie history, writing: "He's not in the film for a long time, but the few scant moments that Gary Oldman plays the psychotic dealer Drexl Spivey make True Romance a classic ... Oldman gave us a glimpse at one of cinema's most unfiltered sociopaths." Maxim journalist Thomas Freeman ranked Spivey as the greatest performance of Oldman's career.

"Robbers", a song by the English indie rock band The 1975 from their 2013 debut album, was inspired by the film. Vocalist Matthew Healy explained: "I got really obsessed with the idea behind Patricia Arquette's character in True Romance when I was about eighteen. That craving for the bad boy in that film [is] so sexualized."

True Romance, the 2013 debut album from English pop star Charli XCX, was named after the film.

Brad Pitt's stoner character in True Romance, Floyd, was the inspiration for making the film Pineapple Express, according to producer Judd Apatow, who "thought it would be funny to make a movie in which you follow that character out of his apartment and watch him get chased by bad guys".

James Gandolfini landed his iconic role of Tony Soprano on The Sopranos when he was invited to audition for the role after casting director Susan Fitzgerald saw a short clip of his performance in True Romance. Gandolfini ultimately received the role ahead of several other actors including Steven Van Zandt and Michael Rispoli.

Soundtrack

Home media
True Romance was originally released on Warner Home Video VHS September 12, 1994.

The DVD was released on September 24, 2002, as a Two-Disc set. It was later released on Blu-ray on May 26, 2009.

The 4K UHD Blu-ray was released on June 28, 2022.

See also

 Cinema of the United States
 List of American films of 1993
 List of hood films

References

External links

 
 
 

1990s black comedy films
1990s road movies
1990s romance films
1993 crime films
1993 films
American black comedy films
American crime films
American road movies
American romance films
Cultural depictions of Elvis Presley
1990s English-language films
Films about drugs
Films about the American Mafia
Films directed by Tony Scott
Films scored by Hans Zimmer
Films set in a movie theatre
Films set in Detroit
Films set in Los Angeles
Films shot in Los Angeles
Films shot in Michigan
Films with screenplays by Quentin Tarantino
Films with screenplays by Roger Avary
Morgan Creek Productions films
Warner Bros. films
Romantic crime films
1990s American films